Culver Props Inc, was an American manufacturer of wooden propellers for homebuilt and ultralight aircraft. In 2001 the company ceased production and was purchased by Valley Engineering LLC. Valley Engineering turned the company into a brand of propellers, which remains in production.

Culver Props Inc had its company headquarters in Galeton, Pennsylvania. In 2001 the production equipment was moved to Valley Engineering and is now located in Rolla, Missouri.

The company makes one-piece wooden propellers carved from northern hard maple and birch.

See also
List of aircraft propeller manufacturers

References

External links 

Aircraft propeller manufacturers
Aerospace companies of the United States